Sampson Hopkins (died 1622) was an English merchant and politician who sat in the House of Commons between 1614 and 1622.

Hopkins was the son of Sir Richard Hopkins of Coventry. He was a draper of Coventry and a puritan. In 1605 he sheltered Princess Elizabeth (later Queen of Bohemia) at his house at Palace Yard in Earl Street, which was built on the courtyard plan. (The building  was destroyed by bombing in 1940.)  He was Mayor of Coventry in 1609. In 1614, he was elected Member of Parliament for Coventry. He was described as being "always so cross and violent in the parliament against the King's affairs" and this  was attributed to the nature of the faction in Coventry which he represented. Nevertheless, Hopkins met the king several times and in 1621 the king granted the city a new charter regulating the election of council members. Hopkins was re-elected MP for Coventry in 1621.
 
Hopkins died in 1622.

Hopkins married as his second wife Jane Butts and was the father of Richard who was also MP for Coventry. His daughter Anne married Matthew Babington.

References

Year of birth missing
1622 deaths
Mayors of Coventry
English merchants
17th-century merchants
English MPs 1614
English MPs 1621–1622
Members of Parliament for Coventry